This is a list of armoured fighting vehicles developed during the interwar years between the end of the First World War (1918) and the start of the Second World War (1939). There is some overlap with tanks that served in the early part of the Second World War.

See also history of the tank, list of armoured fighting vehicles.

Czechoslovakia

Tanks
 LT vz. 34 (50)
 LT vz. 35 (298)
 LT vz. 38

Tankettes
 Tančík vz. 33 (70)
 AH-IV (206)

Armoured cars
 OA vz. 27 (15)
 OA vz. 30 (51)

China
China purchased several hundred armoured combat vehicles during the 1930s.  The exact model and numbers are difficult to obtain, please see this article for more info.

Tanks
 Carden Loyd M1931 Amphibious Tank (29) - purchased in 1935.
 Carden Loyd M1936 (4) - Light two-man tank, purchased in 1936.
 Renault FT (100+) - purchased from Poland & France in 1920s & 1930s.
 Panzer I (10) - purchased from Germany in 1930s.
 T-26 (88) - Licensed copy of British Vickers 6-ton Tank, purchased from Soviets in 1938.

Tankettes
 CV-33 (20-100) - purchased in 1936, numbers disputed.
 Carden Loyd tankette (24) - Armoured Vickers MG carrier, purchased in 1929.

Armoured personnel carriers
 Universal Carrier (unknown)

Armoured cars
 BA-6 (unknown) - purchased from Soviet Union, armed with 45 mm gun turret.

France

Tankettes
Saint-Charmond Modèle 1921

Tanks

Armoured reconnaissance tanks
AMR 33 (123) 
AMR 35 (200)

Light tanks
Hotchkiss H-35 (1,200)
Hotchkiss H-39 (unknown)
Renault R-35 (1,540)
Renault FT-31 (540)
FCM 36 (100)

Medium tanks
SOMUA S35 (440)
Char D2 (100)

Heavy tanks
Char B1 (405)
FCM 2C (10)

Self propelled guns
Canon de 194 mle GPF (50)
 Renault FT BS (39)

Armoured cargo carriers
Renault UE (5,168)
Lorraine 37L (630)

Armored cars
Panhard 178 (941)
AMC Schneider P 16 (100)

Germany

Tanks

Light tanks
 Leichttraktor (4)
 Panzer I (2,288)
 Panzer II (1,856)
 Sd.Kfz. 265 (190)

Medium tanks
 Grosstraktor (6)
 Neubaufahrzeug (5)

Italy

Tanks
 Fiat 3000 (152) - based on the Renault FT
 Fiat M11/39 (100)

Tankettes
 Fiat L3 (2,000-2,500)

Japan

Tanks
 Type 87 Chi-I medium tank (experimental) (1)
 Type 89 I-Go medium tank (404)
 Type 91 heavy tank (experimental) (1)
 Type 95 heavy tank (experimental) (4)
 Type 95 Ha-Go light tank (2,300)
 Type 97 Chi-Ha medium tank (1,162)

Amphibious tanks
 SR I-Go (experimental) (1)
 SR II Ro-Go (experimental) (1)
 SR III Ha-Go (experimental) (1)

Tankettes
 Type 92 cavalry tank (tankette) (167)
 Type 94 tankette (823)
 Type 97 Te-Ke tankette (616)

Armoured cars
 Vickers Crossley armoured car (12)
 Chiyoda armored car (200)
 Sumida M.2593 (Type 91)(1,000)  
 Type 93 armoured car (limited)

Poland
PZInż 130 amphibious tank, single prototype
4TP single prototype
7TP (149)
C7P (151)
TKS tankette (575)
Samochód pancerny wz. 29 (10-13)
Samochód pancerny wz. 34 (unknown)
10TP (unknown)

Soviet Union
At the end of the Russian Civil War, Soviet Russia had a stock of imported Mark V (called Rikardo, after the Ricardo engine), Whippet (Tyeilor, after the Tylor engine), and Renault FT (Reno) tanks, and an assortment armoured trains.

By the time of the German invasion on the 22 June 1941, the Soviets already fielded 222 T-40 light amphibious tanks, 967 T-34 medium tanks and 508 KV-1 and KV-2 heavy tanks.

Armoured cars

Light armoured cars
 D-8 Armoured Car
 D-12
 FAI
 BA-20
 BAD-2 (experimental)

Heavy armoured cars
 BA-27
 BA-3/BA-6/BA-9/BA-10/BA-11

Tankettes
 T-17 "Liliput" (experimental)
 T-23 (experimental)
 T-27

Tanks

Amphibious tanks
 T-37A
 T-38

Light tanks
 Russkiy Reno (or M, copy of Renault FT)
 T-16
 T-18 (or MS-1)
 T-19
 T-26 (license-built copy of Vickers 6-ton)
 BT-2
 BT-5
 BT-7
 BT-8

Flame & engineer tanks
 ST-26 engineer tank
 OT-26 flame tank
 OT-130 flame tank
 KhT-26
 KhT-130
 KhT-133

Medium tanks
 T-24
 T-28
  T-29 (experimental)
 A-20 (experimental)

Heavy tanks
 T-35

Self-propelled guns
 SU-12 76.2mm gun truck
 T-26 A artillery support tank
 BT-7A artillery support tank
 4M quad 7.62mm Maxim anti-aircraft truck
 29K (artillery) 76.2mm anti-aircraft truck
 ZiS-42 25mm anti-aircraft truck

Sweden

Tanks
 Strv m/21-29 (10)
 Strv m/30-31 (3)
 Strv m/38-39-40 (180)

Tankettes
 Strv m/37 (48)

Armoured cars
 Pbil m/39-40 (48)
 Pbil m/41 (5)

United Kingdom

Armoured cars
Vickers Crossley armoured car
 Crossley D2E1 & D2E2
 Morris CS9
Lanchester 6x4 Armoured Car
 Crossley Vickers 20\60 Light 6 Wheeler
 Armstrong Siddeley B10E1 & B10E2

Tankettes 
 Carden Loyd tankette - Mark IV, V, VI
 Crossley-Martel
 Morris-Martel tankette

Tanks 
 Vickers Tank - Number 01 & Number 02 (1921–22)
 Vickers 6-Ton (153)
 Vickers Commercial Light Tank - Model 1933, Model 1934, Model 1936, Model 1937 - sales for export. Design based on Carden-Loyd Light Tank.
 Medium Tank A/T 1 - amphibious tank, experimental
 Vickers Medium Mark C & D - intended for export, prototypes sold to Japan and Ireland.
 Cruiser Mk I - General Staff Specification A9
 Cruiser Mk II 
 Cruiser Mk III 
 Matilda I
 Matilda II
 Light Tank Mk I-Mk V
 Light Tank Mark VI (1,682)
 Light Tank Mk VII Tetrarch (100+)
 Medium Mark I (80)
 Medium Mark II (170)
 A6 "Sixteen tonner" (3 - A6E1, A6E2, A6E3)
 Medium Mark III (3)
 A7 Medium Tank (3 - A7E1, A7E2, A7E3)
 Vickers A1E1 Independent (1 prototype)
 A3E1 Three Man Tank, "Carrier, Machine gun"
 A4E1 Carden-Loyd Mk VII
 A5E1 Vickers 'Carden-Loyd' 3-man light tank
 Vickers Patrol Tank Mk. 1 & Mk. 2
 Vickers D3E1 Wheel Cum Track Tank
 Vickers L3E1 & L3E2 3 Man Light Tanks
 Vickers-Carden-Loyd Light Amphibious Tank (A4E11, A4E12, L1E1, L1E2)

Self-propelled guns 
 Birch gun

United States

Light tanks
 Disston Tractor Tank (6)
 T2 Combat Car
 T2E1 Combat Car
 T5 Combat Car
 T5E1 Combat Car
 M1 Combat Car (~113)
 T7 Combat Car
 T1 Cunningham (6)
 T2 Light Tank
 T3 Light Tank
 M2 Light Tank (~696)
 Christie M.1919

Medium tanks
 T4 Combat Car
 T4E1 Combat Car
 T4E2 Combat Car
 Christie T3 Medium/M.1931/M.1940/T1 Combat Car
 T2 Medium Tank
 M2 Medium Tank
 Medium Tank M1921
 Medium Tank M1922

Armoured cars
 M3 Scout Car (unknown)

Self Propelled guns
 T3 HMC

References

Graham Matthews Table of General Staff 'A' Numbers at Arcaneafvs.com

Interwar